Tsiknopempti is part of the traditional celebrations of , the Greek Carnival season. The celebration, normally translated as Charred Thursday or Smoky Thursday, centers on the consumption of large amounts of grilled and roasted meats.

Celebration
Apokries (Carnival season) in Greece is made up of three themed weeks of celebration. The festivities on Tsiknopempti revolve around large outdoor parties where massive amounts of meat are grilled or roasted. 

Often Tsiknopempti-like celebrations will occur again, generally on a smaller scale, the following Sunday which marks the final day meat can be eaten before the beginning of the Great Lent, the strict fasting season that leads up to Easter. In the Greek Orthodox tradition, fasting on Wednesdays and Fridays is important, therefore Thursday is the best day for Tsiknopempti. Tsiknopempti is celebrated 11 days before Clean Monday (often referred to in English as Ash Monday, to allude to Ash Wednesday in the West, however in Orthodox tradition there is no imposition of ashes).

In Lebanon, a similar tradition exists and is known as Khamis el sakara (Thursday of drinking). 

Similar celebrations known as Fat Thursday are held in many other countries.

Etymology
The Greek word  (Tsiknopempti) is made up of the words  (lit.

See also
 Fat Thursday, a similar traditional Christian feast associated with the celebration of Carnival
 Mardi Gras
 Maslenitsa
 Shrove Tuesday

References

Greek traditions
Thursday observances
Holidays based on the date of Easter